Villain Accelerate is a Canadian instrumental hip hop duo. It consists of underground hip hop artists Sixtoo and Stigg of the Dump. To date, the duo has released one album.

History
Villain Accelerate released an album, Maid of Gold, on Mush Records in 2003. It was praised by The Milk Factory as "a stunning debut, twisting the natural perspective of hip-hop to open new doors and invade new spaces."

Style and influences
The duo's style has been compared to Massive Attack, Portishead, and Unkle.

Discography
Albums
 Maid of Gold (2003)

References

External links
  on Mush Records
 

Canadian hip hop groups
Alternative hip hop groups